The 1926 United States House of Representatives elections were elections for the United States House of Representatives to elect members to serve in the 70th United States Congress. They were held for the most part on November 2, 1926, while Maine held theirs on September 13. They occurred in the middle of President Calvin Coolidge's second term.  Coolidge's Republican Party lost seats to the opposition Democratic Party, but it retained a majority. The most pressing national matters at the time were fragmented, generally related to government's relationship to business or to providing social aid. However, no predominant issue was able to cast a shadow over the election. The small, populist Farmer–Labor Party also held two seats following the election.

Overall results

Source:

Special elections 

Elections are listed by date and district.

|-
! 
| John E. Raker
|  | Democratic
| 1910
|  | Incumbent died January 22, 1926.New member elected August 31, 1926.Republican gain.
| nowrap | 

|-
! 
| Lawrence J. Flaherty
|  | Republican
| 1924
|  | Incumbent died June 13, 1926.New member elected August 31, 1926.Republican hold.
| nowrap | 

|-
! 
| Harry B. Hawes
|  | Democratic
| 1920
|  | Incumbent resigned October 15, 1926 to run for U.S. senator.New member elected November 2, 1926.Democratic hold.
| nowrap | 

|-
! 

|-
! 

|}

Alabama 

|-
| 
| John McDuffie
| | Democratic
| 1918
| Incumbent re-elected.
| nowrap | 

|-
| 
| J. Lister Hill
| | Democratic
| 1923 
| Incumbent re-elected.
| nowrap | 

|-
| 
| Henry B. Steagall
| | Democratic
| 1914
| Incumbent re-elected.
| nowrap | 

|-
| 
| Lamar Jeffers
| | Democratic
| 1921 
| Incumbent re-elected.
| nowrap | 

|-
| 
| William B. Bowling
| | Democratic
| 1920
| Incumbent re-elected.
| nowrap | 

|-
| 
| William B. Oliver
| | Democratic
| 1914
| Incumbent re-elected.
| nowrap | 

|-
| 
| Miles C. Allgood
| | Democratic
| 1922
| Incumbent re-elected.
| nowrap | 

|-
| 
| Edward B. Almon
| | Democratic
| 1914
| Incumbent re-elected.
| nowrap | 

|-
| 
| George Huddleston
| | Democratic
| 1914
| Incumbent re-elected.
| nowrap | 

|-
| 
| William B. Bankhead
| | Democratic
| 1916
| Incumbent re-elected.
| nowrap | 

|}

Arizona 

|-
| 
| Carl Hayden
| | Democratic
| 1911
| | Retired to run for U.S. senator.New member elected.Democratic hold.
| nowrap | 

|}

Arkansas 

|-
| 
| William J. Driver
| | Democratic
| 1920
| Incumbent re-elected.
| nowrap | 

|-
| 
| William A. Oldfield
| | Democratic
| 1908
| Incumbent re-elected.
| nowrap | 

|-
| 
| John N. Tillman
| | Democratic
| 1914
| Incumbent re-elected.
| nowrap | 

|-
| 
| Otis Wingo
| | Democratic
| 1912
| Incumbent re-elected.
| nowrap | 

|-
| 
| Heartsill Ragon
| | Democratic
| 1922
| Incumbent re-elected.
| nowrap | 

|-
| 
| James B. Reed
| | Democratic
| 1923
| Incumbent re-elected.
| nowrap | 

|-
| 
| Tilman B. Parks
| | Democratic
| 1920
| Incumbent re-elected.
| nowrap | 

|}

California 

|-
| 
| Clarence F. Lea
| | Democratic
| 1916
| Incumbent re-elected.
| nowrap | 

|-
| 
| Harry L. Englebright
| | Republican
| 1926
| Incumbent re-elected.
| nowrap | 

|-
| 
| Charles F. Curry
| | Republican
| 1912
| Incumbent re-elected.
| nowrap | 

|-
| 
| Florence Prag Kahn
| | Republican
| 1925
| Incumbent re-elected.
| nowrap | 

|-
| 
| Richard J. Welch
| | Republican
| 1926
| Incumbent re-elected.
| nowrap | 

|-
| 
| Albert E. Carter
| | Republican
| 1924
| Incumbent re-elected.
| nowrap | 

|-
| 
| Henry E. Barbour
| | Republican
| 1918
| Incumbent re-elected.
| nowrap | 

|-
| 
| Arthur M. Free
| | Republican
| 1920
| Incumbent re-elected.
| nowrap | 

|-
| 
| Walter F. Lineberger
| | Republican
| 1921
| | Retired to run for U.S. senator.New member elected.Republican hold.
| nowrap | 

|-
| 
| John D. Fredericks
| | Republican
| 1923
| | Incumbent retired.New member elected.Republican hold.
| nowrap | 

|-
| 
| Philip D. Swing
| | Republican
| 1920
| Incumbent re-elected.
| nowrap | 

|}

Colorado 

|-
| 
| William Newell Vaile
| | Republican
| 1918
| Incumbent re-elected.
| nowrap | 

|-
| 
| Charles Bateman Timberlake
| | Republican
| 1914
| Incumbent re-elected.
| nowrap | 

|-
| 
| Guy Urban Hardy
| | Republican
| 1918
| Incumbent re-elected.
| nowrap | 

|-
| 
| Edward Thomas Taylor
| | Democratic
| 1908
| Incumbent re-elected.
| nowrap | 

|}

Connecticut 

|-
| 
| E. Hart Fenn
| | Republican
| 1920
| Incumbent re-elected.
| nowrap | 

|-
| 
| Richard P. Freeman
| | Republican
| 1914
| Incumbent re-elected.
| nowrap | 

|-
| 
| John Q. Tilson
| | Republican
| 1914
| Incumbent re-elected.
| nowrap | 

|-
| 
| Schuyler Merritt
| | Republican
| 1916
| Incumbent re-elected.
| nowrap | 

|-
| 
| James P. Glynn
| | Republican
| 1924
| Incumbent re-elected.
| nowrap | 

|}

Delaware 

|-
| 
| Robert G. Houston
| | Republican
| 1924
| Incumbent re-elected.
| nowrap | 

|}

Florida 

|-
| 
| Herbert J. Drane
| | Democratic
| 1916
| Incumbent re-elected.
| nowrap | 

|-
| 
| Robert A. Green
| | Democratic
| 1924
| Incumbent re-elected.
| nowrap | 

|-
| 
| John H. Smithwick
| | Democratic
| 1918
| | Incumbent lost renomination.New member elected.Democratic hold.
| nowrap | 

|-
| 
| William J. Sears
| | Democratic
| 1914
| Incumbent re-elected.
| nowrap | 

|}

Georgia 

|-
| 
| Charles Gordon Edwards
| | Democratic
| 1924
| Incumbent re-elected.
| nowrap | 

|-
| 
| Edward E. Cox
| | Democratic
| 1924
| Incumbent re-elected.
| nowrap | 

|-
| 
| Charles R. Crisp
| | Democratic
| 1912
| Incumbent re-elected.
| nowrap | 

|-
| 
| William C. Wright
| | Democratic
| 1918
| Incumbent re-elected.
| nowrap | 

|-
| 
| William D. Upshaw
| | Democratic
| 1918
| | Incumbent lost renomination.New member elected.Democratic hold.
| nowrap | 

|-
| 
| Samuel Rutherford
| | Democratic
| 1924
| Incumbent re-elected.
| nowrap | 

|-
| 
| Gordon Lee
| | Democratic
| 1904
| | Incumbent retired.New member elected.Democratic hold.
| nowrap | 

|-
| 
| Charles H. Brand
| | Democratic
| 1916
| Incumbent re-elected.
| nowrap | 

|-
| 
| Thomas Montgomery Bell
| | Democratic
| 1904
| Incumbent re-elected.
| nowrap | 

|-
| 
| Carl Vinson
| | Democratic
| 1914
| Incumbent re-elected.
| nowrap | 

|-
| 
| William C. Lankford
| | Democratic
| 1918
| Incumbent re-elected.
| nowrap | 

|-
| 
| William W. Larsen
| | Democratic
| 1916
| Incumbent re-elected.
| nowrap | 

|}

Idaho 

|-
| 
| Burton L. French
| | Republican
| 1916
| Incumbent re-elected.
| nowrap | 

|-
| 
| Addison T. Smith
| | Republican
| 1912
| Incumbent re-elected.
| nowrap | 

|}

Illinois 

|-
| 
| Martin B. Madden
| | Republican
| 1904
| Incumbent re-elected.
| nowrap | 

|-
| 
| Morton D. Hull
| | Republican
| 1923
| Incumbent re-elected.
| nowrap | 

|-
| 
| Elliott W. Sproul
| | Republican
| 1920
| Incumbent re-elected.
| nowrap | 

|-
| 
| Thomas A. Doyle
| | Democratic
| 1923
| Incumbent re-elected.
| nowrap | 

|-
| 
| Adolph J. Sabath
| | Democratic
| 1906
| Incumbent re-elected.
| nowrap | 

|-
| 
| John J. Gorman
| | Republican
| 1924
| | Incumbent lost re-election.New member elected.Democratic gain.
| nowrap | 

|-
| 
| M. Alfred Michaelson
| | Republican
| 1920
| Incumbent re-elected.
| nowrap | 

|-
| 
| Stanley H. Kunz
| | Democratic
| 1920
| Incumbent re-elected.
| nowrap | 

|-
| 
| Frederick A. Britten
| | Republican
| 1912
| Incumbent re-elected.
| nowrap | 

|-
| 
| Carl R. Chindblom
| | Republican
| 1918
| Incumbent re-elected.
| nowrap | 

|-
| 
| Frank R. Reid
| | Republican
| 1922
| Incumbent re-elected.
| nowrap | 

|-
| 
| Charles Eugene Fuller
| | Republican
| 1914
| | Incumbent died.New member elected.Republican hold.
| nowrap | 

|-
| 
| William Richard Johnson
| | Republican
| 1924
| Incumbent re-elected.
| nowrap | 

|-
| 
| John Clayton Allen
| | Republican
| 1924
| Incumbent re-elected.
| nowrap | 

|-
| 
| Edward John King
| | Republican
| 1914
| Incumbent re-elected.
| nowrap | 

|-
| 
| William E. Hull
| | Republican
| 1922
| Incumbent re-elected.
| nowrap | 

|-
| 
| Frank H. Funk
| | Republican
| 1920
| | Incumbent lost renomination.New member elected.Republican hold.
| nowrap | 

|-
| 
| William P. Holaday
| | Republican
| 1922
| Incumbent re-elected.
| nowrap | 

|-
| 
| Charles Adkins
| | Republican
| 1924
| Incumbent re-elected.
| nowrap | 

|-
| 
| Henry T. Rainey
| | Democratic
| 1922
| Incumbent re-elected.
| nowrap | 

|-
| 
| Loren E. Wheeler
| | Republican
| 1924
| | Incumbent lost re-election.New member elected.Democratic gain.
| nowrap | 

|-
| 
| Edward M. Irwin
| | Republican
| 1924
| Incumbent re-elected.
| nowrap | 

|-
| 
| William W. Arnold
| | Democratic
| 1922
| Incumbent re-elected.
| nowrap | 

|-
| 
| Thomas Sutler Williams
| | Republican
| 1914
| Incumbent re-elected.
| nowrap | 

|-
| 
| Edward E. Denison
| | Republican
| 1914
| Incumbent re-elected.
| nowrap | 

|-
| 
| Richard Yates Jr.
| | Republican
| 1918
| Incumbent re-elected.
| rowspan=2 nowrap | 

|- 
| 
| Henry R. Rathbone
| | Republican
| 1922
| Incumbent re-elected.

|}

Indiana 

|-
| 
| Harry E. Rowbottom
| | Republican
| 1924
| Incumbent re-elected.
| nowrap | 

|-
| 
| Arthur H. Greenwood
| | Democratic
| 1922
| Incumbent re-elected.
| nowrap | 

|-
| 
| Frank Gardner
| | Democratic
| 1922
| Incumbent re-elected.
| nowrap | 

|-
| 
| Harry C. Canfield
| | Democratic
| 1922
| Incumbent re-elected.
| nowrap | 

|-
| 
| Noble J. Johnson
| | Republican
| 1924
| Incumbent re-elected.
| nowrap | 

|-
| 
| Richard N. Elliott
| | Republican
| 1918
| Incumbent re-elected.
| nowrap | 

|-
| 
| Ralph E. Updike
| | Republican
| 1924
| Incumbent re-elected.
| nowrap | 

|-
| 
| Albert H. Vestal
| | Republican
| 1916
| Incumbent re-elected.
| nowrap | 

|-
| 
| Fred S. Purnell
| | Republican
| 1916
| Incumbent re-elected.
| nowrap | 

|-
| 
| William R. Wood
| | Republican
| 1914
| Incumbent re-elected.
| nowrap | 

|-
| 
| Albert R. Hall
| | Republican
| 1924
| Incumbent re-elected.
| nowrap | 

|-
| 
| David Hogg
| | Republican
| 1924
| Incumbent re-elected.
| nowrap | 

|-
| 
| Andrew J. Hickey
| | Republican
| 1918
| Incumbent re-elected.
| nowrap | 

|}

Iowa 

|-
| 
| William F. Kopp
| | Republican
| 1920
| Incumbent re-elected.
| nowrap | 

|-
| 
| F. Dickinson Letts
| | Republican
| 1924
| Incumbent re-elected.
| nowrap | 

|-
| 
| Thomas J. B. Robinson
| | Republican
| 1922
| Incumbent re-elected.
| nowrap | 

|-
| 
| Gilbert N. Haugen
| | Republican
| 1898
| Incumbent re-elected.
| nowrap | 

|-
| 
| Cyrenus Cole
| | Republican
| 1921
| Incumbent re-elected.
| nowrap | 

|-
| 
| C. William Ramseyer
| | Republican
| 1914
| Incumbent re-elected.
| nowrap | 

|-
| 
| Cassius C. Dowell
| | Republican
| 1914
| Incumbent re-elected.
| nowrap | 

|-
| 
| Lloyd Thurston
| | Republican
| 1924
| Incumbent re-elected.
| nowrap | 

|-
| 
| William R. Green
| | Republican
| 1910
| Incumbent re-elected.
| nowrap | 

|-
| 
| Lester J. Dickinson
| | Republican
| 1918
| Incumbent re-elected.
| nowrap | 

|-
| 
| William D. Boies
| | Republican
| 1918
| Incumbent re-elected.
| nowrap | 

|}

Kansas 

|-
| 
| Daniel R. Anthony Jr.
| | Republican
| 1907 
| Incumbent re-elected.
| nowrap | 

|-
| 
| Chauncey B. Little
| | Democratic
| 1924
| | Incumbent lost re-election.New member elected.Republican gain.
| nowrap | 

|-
| 
| William H. Sproul
| | Republican
| 1922
| Incumbent re-elected.
| nowrap | 

|-
| 
| Homer Hoch
| | Republican
| 1918
| Incumbent re-elected.
| nowrap | 

|-
| 
| James G. Strong
| | Republican
| 1918
| Incumbent re-elected.
| nowrap | 

|-
| 
| Hays B. White
| | Republican
| 1918
| Incumbent re-elected.
| nowrap | 

|-
| 
| Jasper Napoleon Tincher
| | Republican
| 1918
| | Incumbent retired.New member elected.Republican hold.
| nowrap | 

|-
| 
| William Augustus Ayres
| | Democratic
| 19141920 1922
| Incumbent re-elected.
| nowrap | 

|}

Kentucky 

|-
| 
| Alben Barkley
| | Democratic
| 1912
| | Retired to run for U.S. senator.New member elected.Democratic hold.
| nowrap | 

|-
| 
| David Hayes Kincheloe
| | Democratic
| 1914
| Incumbent re-elected.
| nowrap | 

|-
| 
| John William Moore
| | Democratic
| 1925
| Incumbent re-elected.
| nowrap | 

|-
| 
| Ben Johnson
| | Democratic
| 1906
| | Incumbent retired.New member elected.Democratic hold.
| nowrap | 

|-
| 
| Maurice H. Thatcher
| | Republican
| 1922
| Incumbent re-elected.
| nowrap | 

|-
| 
| Arthur B. Rouse
| | Democratic
| 1910
| | Incumbent retired.New member elected.Democratic hold.
| nowrap | 

|-
| 
| Virgil Chapman
| | Democratic
| 1924
| Incumbent re-elected.
| nowrap | 

|-
| 
| Ralph Waldo Emerson Gilbert
| | Democratic
| 1920
| Incumbent re-elected.
| nowrap | 

|-
| 
| Fred M. Vinson
| | Democratic
| 1924
| Incumbent re-elected.
| nowrap | 

|-
| 
| Andrew Jackson Kirk
| | Republican
| 1926
| | Incumbent lost renomination.New member elected.Republican hold.
| nowrap | 

|-
| 
| John M. Robsion
| | Republican
| 1918
| Incumbent re-elected.
| nowrap | 

|}

Louisiana 

|-
| 
| James O'Connor
| | Democratic
| 1918
| Incumbent re-elected.
| nowrap | 

|-
| 
| James Zacharie Spearing
| | Democratic
| 1924
| Incumbent re-elected.
| nowrap | 

|-
| 
| Whitmell P. Martin
| | Democratic
| 1914
| Incumbent re-elected.
| nowrap | 

|-
| 
| John N. Sandlin
| | Democratic
| 1920
| Incumbent re-elected.
| nowrap | 

|-
| 
| Riley Joseph Wilson
| | Democratic
| 1914
| Incumbent re-elected.
| nowrap | 

|-
| 
| Bolivar E. Kemp
| | Democratic
| 1924
| Incumbent re-elected.
| nowrap | 

|-
| 
| Ladislas Lazaro
| | Democratic
| 1912
| Incumbent re-elected.
| nowrap | 

|-
| 
| James Benjamin Aswell
| | Democratic
| 1912
| Incumbent re-elected.
| nowrap | 

|}

Maine 

|-
| 
| Carroll L. Beedy
| | Republican
| 1920
| Incumbent re-elected.
| nowrap | 

|-
| 
| Wallace H. White Jr.
| | Republican
| 1916
| Incumbent re-elected.
| nowrap | 

|-
| 
| John E. Nelson
| | Republican
| 1922
| Incumbent re-elected.
| nowrap | 

|-
| 
| Ira G. Hersey
| | Republican
| 1916
| Incumbent re-elected.
| nowrap | 

|}

Maryland 

|-
| 
| T. Alan Goldsborough
| | Democratic
| 1920
| Incumbent re-elected.
| nowrap | 

|-
| 
| Millard E. Tydings
| | Democratic
| 1922
| | Retired to run for U.S. senator.New member elected.Democratic hold.
| nowrap | 

|-
| 
| John Boynton Philip Clayton Hill
| | Republican
| 1920
| | Retired to run for U.S. senator.New member elected.Democratic gain.
| nowrap | 

|-
| 
| J. Charles Linthicum
| | Democratic
| 1910
| Incumbent re-elected.
| nowrap | 

|-
| 
| Stephen W. Gambrill
| | Democratic
| 1924
| Incumbent re-elected.
| nowrap | 

|-
| 
| Frederick N. Zihlman
| | Republican
| 1916
| Incumbent re-elected.
| nowrap | 

|}

Massachusetts 

|-
| 
| Allen T. Treadway
| | Republican
| 1912
| Incumbent re-elected.
| nowrap | 

|-
| 
| Henry L. Bowles
| | Republican
| 1925
| Incumbent re-elected.
| nowrap | 

|-
| 
| Frank H. Foss
| | Republican
| 1924
| Incumbent re-elected.
| nowrap | 

|-
| 
| George R. Stobbs
| | Republican
| 1924
| Incumbent re-elected.
| nowrap | 

|-
| 
| Edith Nourse Rogers
| | Republican
| 1925
| Incumbent re-elected.
| nowrap | 

|-
| 
| Abram Andrew
| | Republican
| 1921
| Incumbent re-elected.
| nowrap | 

|-
| 
| William P. Connery Jr.
| | Democratic
| 1922
| Incumbent re-elected.
| nowrap | 

|-
| 
| Harry Irving Thayer
| | Republican
| 1924
| | Incumbent died.New member elected.Republican hold.
| nowrap | 

|-
| 
| Charles L. Underhill
| | Republican
| 1920
| Incumbent re-elected.
| nowrap | 

|-
| 
| John J. Douglass
| | Democratic
| 1924
| Incumbent re-elected.
| nowrap | 

|-
| 
| George H. Tinkham
| | Republican
| 1914
| Incumbent re-elected.
| nowrap | 

|-
| 
| James A. Gallivan
| | Democratic
| 1914
| Incumbent re-elected.
| nowrap | 

|-
| 
| Robert Luce
| | Republican
| 1918
| Incumbent re-elected.
| nowrap | 

|-
| 
| Louis A. Frothingham
| | Republican
| 1920
| Incumbent re-elected.
| nowrap | 

|-
| 
| Joseph William Martin Jr.
| | Republican
| 1924
| Incumbent re-elected.
| nowrap | 

|-
| 
| Charles L. Gifford
| | Republican
| 1922
| Incumbent re-elected.
| nowrap | 

|}

Michigan 

|-
| 
| John B. Sosnowski
| | Republican
| 1924
| | Incumbent lost renomination.New member elected.Republican hold.
| nowrap | 

|-
| 
| Earl C. Michener
| | Republican
| 1918
| Incumbent re-elected.
| nowrap | 

|-
| 
| Joseph L. Hooper
| | Republican
| 1925
| Incumbent re-elected.
| nowrap | 

|-
| 
| John C. Ketcham
| | Republican
| 1920
| Incumbent re-elected.
| nowrap | 

|-
| 
| Carl E. Mapes
| | Republican
| 1912
| Incumbent re-elected.
| nowrap | 

|-
| 
| Grant M. Hudson
| | Republican
| 1922
| Incumbent re-elected.
| nowrap | 

|-
| 
| Louis C. Cramton
| | Republican
| 1912
| Incumbent re-elected.
| nowrap | 

|-
| 
| Bird J. Vincent
| | Republican
| 1922
| Incumbent re-elected.
| nowrap | 

|-
| 
| James C. McLaughlin
| | Republican
| 1906
| Incumbent re-elected.
| nowrap | 

|-
| 
| Roy O. Woodruff
| | Republican
| 1920
| Incumbent re-elected.
| nowrap | 

|-
| 
| Frank D. Scott
| | Republican
| 1914
| | Incumbent lost renomination.New member elected.Republican hold.
| nowrap | 

|-
| 
| W. Frank James
| | Republican
| 1914
| Incumbent re-elected.
| nowrap | 

|-
| 
| Clarence J. McLeod
| | Republican
| 1922
| Incumbent re-elected.
| nowrap | 

|}

Minnesota 

|-
| 
| Allen J. Furlow
| | Republican
| 1924
| Incumbent re-elected.
| nowrap | 

|-
| 
| Frank Clague
| | Republican
| 1920
| Incumbent re-elected.
| nowrap | 

|-
| 
| August H. Andresen
| | Republican
| 1924
| Incumbent re-elected.
| nowrap | 

|-
| 
| Oscar Keller
| | Republican
| 1918
| | Incumbent lost renomination.New member elected.Republican hold.
| nowrap | 

|-
| 
| Walter Newton
| | Republican
| 1918
| Incumbent re-elected.
| nowrap | 

|-
| 
| Harold Knutson
| | Republican
| 1916
| Incumbent re-elected.
| nowrap | 

|-
| 
| Ole J. Kvale
| | Farmer–Labor
| 1922
| Incumbent re-elected.
| nowrap | 

|-
| 
| Knud Wefald
| | Farmer–Labor
| 1922
| | Incumbent lost re-election.New member elected.Republican gain.
| nowrap | 

|-
| 
| Godfrey G. Goodwin
| | Republican
| 1924
| Incumbent re-elected.
| nowrap | 

|}

Mississippi 

|-
| 
| John E. Rankin
| | Democratic
| 1920
| Incumbent re-elected.
| nowrap | 

|-
| 
| Bill G. Lowrey
| | Democratic
| 1920
| Incumbent re-elected.
| nowrap | 

|-
| 
| William Madison Whittington
| | Democratic
| 1924
| Incumbent re-elected.
| nowrap | 

|-
| 
| Jeff Busby
| | Democratic
| 1922
| Incumbent re-elected.
| nowrap | 

|-
| 
| Ross A. Collins
| | Democratic
| 1920
| Incumbent re-elected.
| nowrap | 

|-
| 
| T. Webber Wilson
| | Democratic
| 1922
| Incumbent re-elected.
| nowrap | 

|-
| 
| Percy E. Quin
| | Democratic
| 1912
| Incumbent re-elected.
| nowrap | 

|-
| 
| James W. Collier
| | Democratic
| 1908
| Incumbent re-elected.
| nowrap | 

|}

Missouri 

|-
| 
| Milton A. Romjue
| | Democratic
| 1922
| Incumbent re-elected.
| nowrap | 

|-
| 
| Ralph F. Lozier
| | Democratic
| 1922
| Incumbent re-elected.
| nowrap | 

|-
| 
| Jacob L. Milligan
| | Democratic
| 1922
| Incumbent re-elected.
| nowrap | 

|-
| 
| Charles L. Faust
| | Republican
| 1920
| Incumbent re-elected.
| nowrap | 

|-
| 
| Edgar C. Ellis
| | Republican
| 1924
| | Incumbent lost re-election.New member elected.Democratic gain.
| nowrap | 

|-
| 
| Clement C. Dickinson
| | Democratic
| 1922
| Incumbent re-elected.
| nowrap | 

|-
| 
| Samuel C. Major
| | Democratic
| 1922
| Incumbent re-elected.
| nowrap | 

|-
| 
| William L. Nelson
| | Democratic
| 1924
| Incumbent re-elected.
| nowrap | 

|-
| 
| Clarence Cannon
| | Democratic
| 1922
| Incumbent re-elected.
| nowrap | 

|-
| 
| Cleveland A. Newton
| | Republican
| 1918
| | Incumbent retired.New member elected.Republican hold.
| nowrap | 

|-
| 
| Harry B. Hawes
| | Democratic
| 1920
| | Incumbent resigned to run for U.S. senator.New member elected.Democratic hold.Winner also elected to finish the current term, see above.
| nowrap | 

|-
| 
| Leonidas C. Dyer
| | Republican
| 1914
| Incumbent re-elected.
| nowrap | 

|-
| 
| Charles Edward Kiefner
| | Republican
| 1924
| | Incumbent lost re-election.New member elected.Democratic gain.
| nowrap | 

|-
| 
| Ralph E. Bailey
| | Republican
| 1924
| | Incumbent retired.New member elected.Democratic gain.
| nowrap | 

|-
| 
| Joe J. Manlove
| | Republican
| 1922
| Incumbent re-elected.
| nowrap | 

|-
| 
| Thomas L. Rubey
| | Democratic
| 1922
| Incumbent re-elected.
| nowrap | 

|}

Montana 

|-
| 
| John M. Evans
| | Democratic
| 1922
| Incumbent re-elected.
| nowrap | 

|-
| 
| Scott Leavitt
| | Republican
| 1922
| Incumbent re-elected.
| nowrap | 

|}

Nebraska 

|-
| 
| John H. Morehead
| | Democratic
| 1922
| Incumbent re-elected.
| nowrap | 

|-
| 
| Willis G. Sears
| | Republican
| 1922
| Incumbent re-elected.
| nowrap | 

|-
| 
| Edgar Howard
| | Democratic
| 1922
| Incumbent re-elected.
| nowrap | 

|-
| 
| Melvin O. McLaughlin
| | Republican
| 1918
| | Incumbent lost re-election.New member elected.Democratic gain.
| nowrap | 

|-
| 
| Ashton C. Shallenberger
| | Democratic
| 1922
| Incumbent re-elected.
| nowrap | 

|-
| 
| Robert G. Simmons
| | Republican
| 1922
| Incumbent re-elected.
| nowrap | 

|}

Nevada 

|-
| 
| Samuel S. Arentz
| | Republican
| 1924
| Incumbent re-elected.
| nowrap | 

|}

New Hampshire 

|-
| 
| Fletcher Hale
| | Republican
| 1924
| Incumbent re-elected.
| nowrap | 

|-
| 
| Edward Hills Wason
| | Republican
| 1914
| Incumbent re-elected.
| nowrap | 

|}

New Jersey 

|-
| 
| Francis F. Patterson Jr.
| | Republican
| 1920
| | Incumbent lost renomination.New member elected.Republican hold.
| nowrap | 

|-
| 
| Isaac Bacharach
| | Republican
| 1914
| Incumbent re-elected.
| nowrap | 

|-
| 
| Stewart H. Appleby
| | Republican
| 1925
| | Incumbent retired.New member elected.Republican hold.
| nowrap | 

|-
| 
| Charles A. Eaton
| | Republican
| 1924
| Incumbent re-elected.
| nowrap | 

|-
| 
| Ernest R. Ackerman
| | Republican
| 1918
| Incumbent re-elected.
| nowrap | 

|-
| 
| Randolph Perkins
| | Republican
| 1920
| Incumbent re-elected.
| nowrap | 

|-
| 
| George N. Seger
| | Republican
| 1922
| Incumbent re-elected.
| nowrap | 

|-
| 
| Herbert W. Taylor
| | Republican
| 1924
| | Incumbent lost re-election.New member elected.Democratic gain.
| nowrap | 

|-
| 
| Franklin W. Fort
| | Republican
| 1924
| Incumbent re-elected.
| nowrap | 

|-
| 
| Frederick R. Lehlbach
| | Republican
| 1914
| Incumbent re-elected.
| nowrap | 

|-
| 
| Oscar L. Auf der Heide
| | Democratic
| 1924
| Incumbent re-elected.
| nowrap | 

|-
| 
| Mary Teresa Norton
| | Democratic
| 1924
| Incumbent re-elected.
| nowrap | 

|}

New Mexico 

|-
| 
| John Morrow
| | Democratic
| 1922
| Incumbent re-elected.
| nowrap | 

|}

New York 

|-
| 
| Robert L. Bacon
| | Republican
| 1922
| Incumbent re-elected.
| nowrap | 

|-
| 
| John J. Kindred
| | Democratic
| 1920
| Incumbent re-elected.
| nowrap | 

|-
| 
| George W. Lindsay
| | Democratic
| 1922
| Incumbent re-elected.
| nowrap | 

|-
| 
| Thomas H. Cullen
| | Democratic
| 1918
| Incumbent re-elected.
| nowrap | 

|-
| 
| Loring M. Black Jr.
| | Democratic
| 1922
| Incumbent re-elected.
| nowrap | 

|-
| 
| Andrew Lawrence Somers
| | Democratic
| 1924
| Incumbent re-elected.
| nowrap | 

|-
| 
| John F. Quayle
| | Democratic
| 1922
| Incumbent re-elected.
| nowrap | 

|-
| 
| William E. Cleary
| | Democratic
| 1922
| | Incumbent retired.New member elected.Democratic hold.
| nowrap | 

|-
| 
| David J. O'Connell
| | Democratic
| 1922
| Incumbent re-elected.
| nowrap | 

|-
| 
| Emanuel Celler
| | Democratic
| 1922
| Incumbent re-elected.
| nowrap | 

|-
| 
| Anning S. Prall
| | Democratic
| 1923
| Incumbent re-elected.
| nowrap | 

|-
| 
| Samuel Dickstein
| | Democratic
| 1922
| Incumbent re-elected.
| nowrap | 

|-
| 
| Christopher D. Sullivan
| | Democratic
| 1916
| Incumbent re-elected.
| nowrap | 

|-
| 
| Nathan D. Perlman
| | Republican
| 1920
| | Incumbent lost re-election.New member elected.Democratic gain.
| nowrap | 

|-
| 
| John J. Boylan
| | Democratic
| 1922
| Incumbent re-elected.
| nowrap | 

|-
| 
| John J. O'Connor
| | Democratic
| 1923
| Incumbent re-elected.
| nowrap | 

|-
| 
| Ogden L. Mills
| | Republican
| 1920
| | Retired to run for Governor of New York.New member elected.Democratic gain.
| nowrap | 

|-
| 
| John F. Carew
| | Democratic
| 1912
| Incumbent re-elected.
| nowrap | 

|-
| 
| Sol Bloom
| | Democratic
| 1923
| Incumbent re-elected.
| nowrap | 

|-
| 
| Fiorello H. LaGuardia
| | Republican
| 1922
| Incumbent re-elected.
| nowrap | 

|-
| 
| Royal H. Weller
| | Democratic
| 1922
| Incumbent re-elected.
| nowrap | 

|-
| 
| Anthony J. Griffin
| | Democratic
| 1918
| Incumbent re-elected.
| nowrap | 

|-
| 
| Frank Oliver
| | Democratic
| 1922
| Incumbent re-elected.
| nowrap | 

|-
| 
| Benjamin L. Fairchild
| | Republican
| 1923
| | Incumbent lost re-election.New member elected.Democratic gain.
| nowrap | 

|-
| 
| J. Mayhew Wainwright
| | Republican
| 1922
| Incumbent re-elected.
| nowrap | 

|-
| 
| Hamilton Fish Jr.
| | Republican
| 1920
| Incumbent re-elected.
| nowrap | 

|-
| 
| Harcourt J. Pratt
| | Republican
| 1924
| Incumbent re-elected.
| nowrap | 

|-
| 
| Parker Corning
| | Democratic
| 1922
| Incumbent re-elected.
| nowrap | 

|-
| 
| James S. Parker
| | Republican
| 1912
| Incumbent re-elected.
| nowrap | 

|-
| 
| Frank Crowther
| | Republican
| 1918
| Incumbent re-elected.
| nowrap | 

|-
| 
| Bertrand Snell
| | Republican
| 1915
| Incumbent re-elected.
| nowrap | 

|-
| 
| Thaddeus C. Sweet
| | Republican
| 1923
| Incumbent re-elected.
| nowrap | 

|-
| 
| Frederick M. Davenport
| | Republican
| 1924
| Incumbent re-elected.
| nowrap | 

|-
| 
| Harold S. Tolley
| | Republican
| 1924
| | Incumbent lost renomination.New member elected.Republican hold.
| nowrap | 

|-
| 
| Walter W. Magee
| | Republican
| 1914
| Incumbent re-elected.
| nowrap | 

|-
| 
| John Taber
| | Republican
| 1922
| Incumbent re-elected.
| nowrap | 

|-
| 
| Gale H. Stalker
| | Republican
| 1922
| Incumbent re-elected.
| nowrap | 

|-
| 
| Meyer Jacobstein
| | Democratic
| 1922
| Incumbent re-elected.
| nowrap | 

|-
| 
| Archie D. Sanders
| | Republican
| 1916
| Incumbent re-elected.
| nowrap | 

|-
| 
| S. Wallace Dempsey
| | Republican
| 1914
| Incumbent re-elected.
| nowrap | 

|-
| 
| Clarence MacGregor
| | Republican
| 1918
| Incumbent re-elected.
| nowrap | 

|-
| 
| James M. Mead
| | Democratic
| 1918
| Incumbent re-elected.
| nowrap | 

|-
| 
| Daniel A. Reed
| | Republican
| 1918
| Incumbent re-elected.
| nowrap | 

|}

North Carolina 

|-
| 
| Lindsay C. Warren
| | Democratic
| 1924
| Incumbent re-elected.
| nowrap | 

|-
| 
| John H. Kerr
| | Democratic
| 1923
| Incumbent re-elected.
| nowrap | 

|-
| 
| Charles L. Abernethy
| | Democratic
| 1922
| Incumbent re-elected.
| nowrap | 

|-
| 
| Edward W. Pou
| | Democratic
| 1900
| Incumbent re-elected.
| nowrap | 

|-
| 
| Charles Manly Stedman
| | Democratic
| 1910
| Incumbent re-elected.
| nowrap | 

|-
| 
| Homer L. Lyon
| | Democratic
| 1920
| Incumbent re-elected.
| nowrap | 

|-
| 
| William C. Hammer
| | Democratic
| 1920
| Incumbent re-elected.
| nowrap | 

|-
| 
| Robert L. Doughton
| | Democratic
| 1910
| Incumbent re-elected.
| nowrap | 

|-
| 
| Alfred L. Bulwinkle
| | Democratic
| 1920
| Incumbent re-elected.
| nowrap | 

|-
| 
| Zebulon Weaver
| | Democratic
| 1916
| Incumbent re-elected.
| nowrap | 

|}

North Dakota 

|-
| 
| Olger B. Burtness
| | Republican
| 1920
| Incumbent re-elected.
| nowrap | 

|-
| 
| Thomas Hall
| | Republican
| 1924
| Incumbent re-elected.
| nowrap | 

|-
| 
| James H. Sinclair
| | Republican
| 1918
| Incumbent re-elected.
| nowrap | 

|}

Ohio 

|-
| 
| Nicholas Longworth
| | Republican
| 1914
| Incumbent re-elected.
| nowrap | 

|-
| 
| Ambrose E. B. Stephens
| | Republican
| 1918
| Incumbent re-elected.
| nowrap | 

|-
| 
| Roy G. Fitzgerald
| | Republican
| 1920
| Incumbent re-elected.
| nowrap | 

|-
| 
| William T. Fitzgerald
| | Republican
| 1924
| Incumbent re-elected.
| nowrap | 

|-
| 
| Charles J. Thompson
| | Republican
| 1918
| Incumbent re-elected.
| nowrap | 

|-
| 
| Charles C. Kearns
| | Republican
| 1914
| Incumbent re-elected.
| nowrap | 

|-
| 
| Charles Brand
| | Republican
| 1922
| Incumbent re-elected.
| nowrap | 

|-
| 
| Thomas B. Fletcher
| | Democratic
| 1924
| Incumbent re-elected.
| nowrap | 

|-
| 
| William W. Chalmers
| | Republican
| 1924
| Incumbent re-elected.
| nowrap | 

|-
| 
| Thomas A. Jenkins
| | Republican
| 1924
| Incumbent re-elected.
| nowrap | 

|-
| 
| Mell G. Underwood
| | Democratic
| 1922
| Incumbent re-elected.
| nowrap | 

|-
| 
| John C. Speaks
| | Republican
| 1920
| Incumbent re-elected.
| nowrap | 

|-
| 
| James T. Begg
| | Republican
| 1918
| Incumbent re-elected.
| nowrap | 

|-
| 
| Martin L. Davey
| | Democratic
| 1922
| Incumbent re-elected.
| nowrap | 

|-
| 
| C. Ellis Moore
| | Republican
| 1918
| Incumbent re-elected.
| nowrap | 

|-
| 
| John McSweeney
| | Democratic
| 1922
| Incumbent re-elected.
| nowrap | 

|-
| 
| William M. Morgan
| | Republican
| 1920
| Incumbent re-elected.
| nowrap | 

|-
| 
| B. Frank Murphy
| | Republican
| 1918
| Incumbent re-elected.
| nowrap | 

|-
| 
| John G. Cooper
| | Republican
| 1914
| Incumbent re-elected.
| nowrap | 

|-
| 
| Charles A. Mooney
| | Democratic
| 1922
| Incumbent re-elected.
| nowrap | 

|-
| 
| Robert Crosser
| | Democratic
| 1922
| Incumbent re-elected.
| nowrap | 

|-
| 
| Theodore E. Burton
| | Republican
| 1920
| Incumbent re-elected.
| nowrap | 

|}

Oklahoma 

|-
| 
| Samuel J. Montgomery
| | Republican
| 1924
| | Incumbent lost re-election.New member elected.Democratic gain.
| nowrap | 

|-
| 
| William W. Hastings
| | Democratic
| 1922
| Incumbent re-elected.
| nowrap | 

|-
| 
| Charles D. Carter
| | Democratic
| 1907 
| | Incumbent lost renomination.New member elected.Democratic hold.
| nowrap | 

|-
| 
| Tom D. McKeown
| | Democratic
| 1922
| Incumbent re-elected.
| nowrap | 

|-
| 
| Fletcher B. Swank
| | Democratic
| 1920
| Incumbent re-elected.
| nowrap | 

|-
| 
| Elmer Thomas
| | Democratic
| 1922
| | Retired to run for U.S. senator.New member elected.Democratic hold.
| nowrap | 

|-
| 
| James V. McClintic
| | Democratic
| 1914
| Incumbent re-elected.
| nowrap | 

|-
| 
| Milton C. Garber
| | Republican
| 1922
| Incumbent re-elected.
| nowrap | 

|}

Oregon 

|-
| 
| Willis C. Hawley
| | Republican
| 1906
| Incumbent re-elected.
| nowrap | 

|-
| 
| Nicholas J. Sinnott
| | Republican
| 1912
| Incumbent re-elected.
| nowrap | 

|-
| 
| Maurice E. Crumpacker
| | Republican
| 1924
| Incumbent re-elected.
| nowrap | 

|}

Pennsylvania 

|-
| 
| William S. Vare
| | Republican
| 1912
| | Retired to run for U.S. senator.New member elected.Republican hold.
| nowrap | 

|-
| 
| George S. Graham
| | Republican
| 1912
| Incumbent re-elected.
| nowrap | 

|-
| 
| Harry C. Ransley
| | Republican
| 1920
| Incumbent re-elected.
| nowrap | 

|-
| 
| Benjamin M. Golder
| | Republican
| 1924
| Incumbent re-elected.
| nowrap | 

|-
| 
| James J. Connolly
| | Republican
| 1920
| Incumbent re-elected.
| nowrap | 

|-
| 
| George A. Welsh
| | Republican
| 1922
| Incumbent re-elected.
| nowrap | 

|-
| 
| George P. Darrow
| | Republican
| 1914
| Incumbent re-elected.
| nowrap | 

|-
| 
| Thomas S. Butler
| | Republican
| 1896
| Incumbent re-elected.
| nowrap | 

|-
| 
| Henry Winfield Watson
| | Republican
| 1914
| Incumbent re-elected.
| nowrap | 

|-
| 
| William Walton Griest
| | Republican
| 1908
| Incumbent re-elected.
| nowrap | 

|-
| 
| Laurence H. Watres
| | Republican
| 1922
| Incumbent re-elected.
| nowrap | 

|-
| 
| Edmund N. Carpenter
| | Republican
| 1924
| | Incumbent lost re-election.New member elected.Democratic gain.
| nowrap | 

|-
| 
| George F. Brumm
| | Republican
| 1922
| | Incumbent lost renomination.New member elected.Republican hold.
| nowrap | 

|-
| 
| Charles J. Esterly
| | Republican
| 1924
| | Incumbent retired.New member elected.Republican hold.
| nowrap | 

|-
| 
| Louis T. McFadden
| | Republican
| 1914
| Incumbent re-elected.
| nowrap | 

|-
| 
| Edgar R. Kiess
| | Republican
| 1912
| Incumbent re-elected.
| nowrap | 

|-
| 
| Frederick W. Magrady
| | Republican
| 1924
| Incumbent re-elected.
| nowrap | 

|-
| 
| Edward M. Beers
| | Republican
| 1922
| Incumbent re-elected.
| nowrap | 

|-
| 
| Joshua W. Swartz
| | Republican
| 1924
| | Incumbent retired.New member elected.Republican hold.
| nowrap | 

|-
| 
| Anderson H. Walters
| | Republican
| 1924
| | Incumbent retired.New member elected.Republican hold.
| nowrap | 

|-
| 
| J. Banks Kurtz
| | Republican
| 1922
| Incumbent re-elected.
| nowrap | 

|-
| 
| Franklin Menges
| | Republican
| 1924
| Incumbent re-elected.
| nowrap | 

|-
| 
| William I. Swoope
| | Republican
| 1922
| | Incumbent retired.New member elected.Republican hold.
| nowrap | 

|-
| 
| Samuel Austin Kendall
| | Republican
| 1918
| Incumbent re-elected.
| nowrap | 

|-
| 
| Henry Wilson Temple
| | Republican
| 1912
| Incumbent re-elected.
| nowrap | 

|-
| 
| Thomas Wharton Phillips Jr.
| | Republican
| 1922
| | Retired to run for Governor of Pennsylvania.New member elected.Republican hold.
| nowrap | 

|-
| 
| Nathan Leroy Strong
| | Republican
| 1916
| Incumbent re-elected.
| nowrap | 

|-
| 
| Harris J. Bixler
| | Republican
| 1920
| | Incumbent lost renomination.New member elected.Republican hold.
| nowrap | 

|-
| 
| Milton W. Shreve
| | Republican
| 1918
| Incumbent re-elected.
| nowrap | 

|-
| 
| William R. Coyle
| | Republican
| 1924
| | Incumbent lost re-election.New member elected.Democratic gain.
| nowrap | 

|-
| 
| Adam M. Wyant
| | Republican
| 1920
| Incumbent re-elected.
| nowrap | 

|-
| 
| Stephen Geyer Porter
| | Republican
| 1910
| Incumbent re-elected.
| nowrap | 

|-
| 
| Melville Clyde Kelly
| | Republican
| 1916
| Incumbent re-elected.
| nowrap | 

|-
| 
| John M. Morin
| | Republican
| 1912
| Incumbent re-elected.
| nowrap | 

|-
| 
| James M. Magee
| | Republican
| 1922
| | Incumbent lost renomination.New member elected.Defeated as Labor-ProhibitionRepublican hold.
| nowrap | 

|-
| 
| Guy E. Campbell
| | Republican
| 1916
| Incumbent re-elected.
| nowrap | 

|}

Rhode Island 

|-
| 
| Clark Burdick
| | Republican
| 1918
| Incumbent re-elected.
| nowrap | 

|-
| 
| Richard S. Aldrich
| | Republican
| 1922
| Incumbent re-elected.
| nowrap | 

|-
| 
| Jeremiah E. O'Connell
| | Democratic
| 1922
| | Incumbent lost re-election.New member elected.Republican gain.
| nowrap | 

|}

South Carolina 

|-
| 
| Thomas S. McMillan
| | Democratic
| 1924
| Incumbent re-elected.
| nowrap | 

|-
| 
| Butler B. Hare
| | Democratic
| 1924
| Incumbent re-elected.
| nowrap | 

|-
| 
| Frederick H. Dominick
| | Democratic
| 1916
| Incumbent re-elected.
| nowrap | 

|-
| 
| John J. McSwain
| | Democratic
| 1920
| Incumbent re-elected.
| nowrap | 

|-
| 
| William Francis Stevenson
| | Democratic
| 1917
| Incumbent re-elected.
| nowrap | 

|-
| 
| Allard H. Gasque
| | Democratic
| 1922
| Incumbent re-elected.
| nowrap | 

|-
| 
| Hampton P. Fulmer
| | Democratic
| 1920
| Incumbent re-elected.
| nowrap | 

|}

South Dakota 

|-
| 
| Charles A. Christopherson
| | Republican
| 1918
| Incumbent re-elected.
| nowrap | 

|-
| 
| Royal C. Johnson
| | Republican
| 1914
| Incumbent re-elected.
| nowrap | 

|-
| 
| William Williamson
| | Republican
| 1920
| Incumbent re-elected.
| nowrap | 

|}

Tennessee 

|-
| 
| B. Carroll Reece
| | Republican
| 1920
| Incumbent re-elected.
| nowrap | 

|-
| 
| J. Will Taylor
| | Republican
| 1918
| Incumbent re-elected.
| nowrap | 

|-
| 
| Sam D. McReynolds
| | Democratic
| 1922
| Incumbent re-elected.
| nowrap | 

|-
| 
| Cordell Hull
| | Democratic
| 1922
| Incumbent re-elected.
| nowrap | 

|-
| 
| Ewin L. Davis
| | Democratic
| 1918
| Incumbent re-elected.
| nowrap | 

|-
| 
| Joseph W. Byrns, Sr.
| | Democratic
| 1908
| Incumbent re-elected.
| nowrap | 

|-
| 
| Edward Everett Eslick
| | Democratic
| 1924
| Incumbent re-elected.
| nowrap | 

|-
| 
| Gordon Browning
| | Democratic
| 1922
| Incumbent re-elected.
| nowrap | 

|-
| 
| Finis J. Garrett
| | Democratic
| 1904
| Incumbent re-elected.
| nowrap | 

|-
| 
| Hubert Fisher
| | Democratic
| 1916
| Incumbent re-elected.
| nowrap | 

|}

Texas 

|-
| 
| Eugene Black
| | Democratic
| 1914
| Incumbent re-elected.
| nowrap | 

|-
| 
| John C. Box
| | Democratic
| 1918
| Incumbent re-elected.
| nowrap | 

|-
| 
| Morgan G. Sanders
| | Democratic
| 1920
| Incumbent re-elected.
| nowrap | 

|-
| 
| Sam Rayburn
| | Democratic
| 1912
| Incumbent re-elected.
| nowrap | 

|-
| 
| Hatton W. Sumners
| | Democratic
| 1914
| Incumbent re-elected.
| nowrap | 

|-
| 
| Luther A. Johnson
| | Democratic
| 1922
| Incumbent re-elected.
| nowrap | 

|-
| 
| Clay Stone Briggs
| | Democratic
| 1918
| Incumbent re-elected.
| nowrap | 

|-
| 
| Daniel E. Garrett
| | Democratic
| 1920
| Incumbent re-elected.
| nowrap | 

|-
| 
| Joseph J. Mansfield
| | Democratic
| 1916
| Incumbent re-elected.
| nowrap | 

|-
| 
| James P. Buchanan
| | Democratic
| 1912
| Incumbent re-elected.
| nowrap | 

|-
| 
| Tom Connally
| | Democratic
| 1916
| Incumbent re-elected.
| nowrap | 

|-
| 
| Fritz G. Lanham
| | Democratic
| 1919
| Incumbent re-elected.
| nowrap | 

|-
| 
| Guinn Williams
| | Democratic
| 1922
| Incumbent re-elected.
| nowrap | 

|-
| 
| Harry M. Wurzbach
| | Republican
| 1920
| Incumbent re-elected.
| nowrap | 

|-
| 
| John Nance Garner
| | Democratic
| 1902
| Incumbent re-elected.
| nowrap | 

|-
| 
| Claude Benton Hudspeth
| | Democratic
| 1918
| Incumbent re-elected.
| nowrap | 

|-
| 
| Thomas L. Blanton
| | Democratic
| 1916
| Incumbent re-elected.
| nowrap | 

|-
| 
| John Marvin Jones
| | Democratic
| 1916
| Incumbent re-elected.
| nowrap | 

|}

Utah 

|-
| 
| Don B. Colton
| | Republican
| 1920
| Incumbent re-elected.
| nowrap | 

|-
| 
| Elmer O. Leatherwood
| | Republican
| 1920
| Incumbent re-elected.
| nowrap | 

|}

Vermont 

|-
| 
| Elbert S. Brigham
| | Republican
| 1924
| Incumbent re-elected.
| nowrap | 

|-
| 
| Ernest Willard Gibson
| | Republican
| 1923
| Incumbent re-elected.
| nowrap | 

|}

Virginia 

|-
| 
| S. Otis Bland
| | Democratic
| 1918
| Incumbent re-elected.
| nowrap | 

|-
| 
| Joseph T. Deal
| | Democratic
| 1920
| Incumbent re-elected.
| nowrap | 

|-
| 
| Andrew Jackson Montague
| | Democratic
| 1912
| Incumbent re-elected.
| nowrap | 

|-
| 
| Patrick H. Drewry
| | Democratic
| 1920
| Incumbent re-elected.
| nowrap | 

|-
| 
| Joseph Whitehead
| | Democratic
| 1924
| Incumbent re-elected.
| nowrap | 

|-
| 
| Clifton A. Woodrum
| | Democratic
| 1922
| Incumbent re-elected.
| nowrap | 

|-
| 
| Thomas W. Harrison
| | Democratic
| 1916
| Incumbent re-elected.
| nowrap | 

|-
| 
| R. Walton Moore
| | Democratic
| 1919
| Incumbent re-elected.
| nowrap | 

|-
| 
| George C. Peery
| | Democratic
| 1922
| Incumbent re-elected.
| nowrap | 

|-
| 
| Henry St. George Tucker III
| | Democratic
| 1922
| Incumbent re-elected.
| nowrap | 

|}

Washington 

|-
| 
| John Franklin Miller
| | Republican
| 1916
| Incumbent re-elected.
| nowrap | 

|-
| 
| Lindley H. Hadley
| | Republican
| 1914
| Incumbent re-elected.
| nowrap | 

|-
| 
| Albert Johnson
| | Republican
| 1912
| Incumbent re-elected.
| nowrap | 

|-
| 
| John W. Summers
| | Republican
| 1918
| Incumbent re-elected.
| nowrap | 

|-
| 
| Samuel B. Hill
| | Democratic
| 1923
| Incumbent re-elected.
| nowrap | 

|}

West Virginia 

|-
| 
| Carl G. Bachmann
| | Republican
| 1924
| Incumbent re-elected.
| nowrap | 

|-
| 
| Frank L. Bowman
| | Republican
| 1924
| Incumbent re-elected.
| nowrap | 

|-
| 
| John M. Wolverton
| | Republican
| 1924
| | Incumbent lost re-election.New member elected.Democratic gain.
| nowrap | 

|-
| 
| Harry C. Woodyard
| | Republican
| 1924
| | Incumbent retired.New member elected.Republican hold.
| nowrap | 

|-
| 
| James F. Strother
| | Republican
| 1924
| Incumbent re-elected.
| nowrap | 

|-
| 
| J. Alfred Taylor
| | Democratic
| 1922
| | Incumbent lost re-election.New member elected.Republican gain.
| nowrap | 

|}

Wisconsin 

|-
| 
| Henry A. Cooper
| | Republican
| 1920
| Incumbent re-elected.
| nowrap | 

|-
| 
| Edward Voigt
| | Republican
| 1916
| | Incumbent retired.New member elected.Republican hold.
| nowrap | 

|-
| 
| John M. Nelson
| | Republican
| 1920
| Incumbent re-elected.
| nowrap | 

|-
| 
| John C. Schafer
| | Republican
| 1922
| Incumbent re-elected.
| nowrap | 

|-
| 
| Victor L. Berger
| | Socialist
| 1922
| Incumbent re-elected.
| nowrap | 

|-
| 
| Florian Lampert
| | Republican
| 1918
| Incumbent re-elected.
| nowrap | 

|-
| 
| Joseph D. Beck
| | Republican
| 1920
| Incumbent re-elected.
| nowrap | 

|-
| 
| Edward E. Browne
| | Republican
| 1912
| Incumbent re-elected.
| nowrap | 

|-
| 
| George J. Schneider
| | Republican
| 1922
| Incumbent re-elected.
| nowrap | 

|-
| 
| James A. Frear
| | Republican
| 1912
| Incumbent re-elected.
| nowrap | 

|-
| 
| Hubert H. Peavey
| | Republican
| 1922
| Incumbent re-elected.
| nowrap | 

|}

Wyoming 

|-
| 
| Charles E. Winter
| | Republican
| 1922
| Incumbent re-elected.
| nowrap | 

|}

Non-voting delegates

Alaska Territory 

|-
| 
| Daniel A. Sutherland
|  | Republican
| 1920
| Incumbent re-elected.
| nowrap | 

|}

See also
 1926 United States elections
 1926 United States Senate elections
 69th United States Congress
 70th United States Congress

Notes

References